Austin Krajicek and Franko Škugor were the defending champions, but Krajicek chose to compete at the Summer Olympics and Škugor chose not to defend his title.

Alexander Erler and Lucas Miedler won the title, defeating Roman Jebavý and Matwé Middelkoop in the final, 7–5, 7–6(7–5).

Seeds

Draw

References

External links
 Main Draw

Generali Open Kitzbühel - Doubles
2021 Doubles